"Can You Rock It Like This" is a 1985 single by Run–D.M.C. It is the third single from their album, King of Rock. The lyrics were written by LL Cool J. The song was sampled for the song "Can You Move It Like This" by Baha Men without credit. Like many songs on the album, the guitar parts are by Eddie Martinez.

Cover versions
In 1996, the song was covered by Insight 23 for the electro-industrial various artists compilation Operation Beatbox.

Track listing
7" – Profile (US)
 "Can You Rock It Like This" – 3:58
 "Together Forever (Krush-Groove 4) (Live At Hollis Park '84)" – 3:32

12" – Profile (US)
 "Can You Rock It Like This" – 4:28
 "Together Forever (Krush-Groove 4) (Live At Hollis Park '84)" – 3:32

Charts

References

1985 singles
Run-DMC songs
Songs written by LL Cool J
Songs written by Rick Rubin
1985 songs
Profile Records singles